Kohi Mero is a 2010 Nepali film directed by Alok Nembang under the banner of Movies.com. This romantic drama marks the comeback of Jharana Bajracharya and stars Aryan Sigdel, Sanchita Luitel and introduces Subash Thapa in lead roles.

Plot
Kohi Mero is the fun, flirtatious, youthful story of four friends who embark on a journey to discover the meaning of love and friendship. Each of us desire love, and each of us desire a specific kind of love and a specific way of illuminating our lives through it. Abhi, Ashna, Prayash and Dibya are similarly in search of a special kind of love. Ashna and Prayash, two friends who have known each other forever, are separated by circumstance from Abhi, their mischievous but poetic
friend who chooses ambition over friendship. Years later, at a fateful time in their lives, he realizes that he has to choose again, between keeping his friendship and going after the love of his life.

Similarly, Ashna faces the choice between being true to herself and doing right by her family and society. Love demands sacrifice, they all learn: the bigger the sacrifice, the sweeter the reward, sometimes as freedom, and sometimes as the knowledge that the person you love has gained everything you'd wish for them.

"Kohi Mero" is a story about the search for that special person and the special sacrifice it takes for us to show our love for each other.

Cast 
Jharana Bajracharya
Aaryan Sigdel
Sanchita Luitel
Subash Thapa
Dinesh Sharma
Radha Lamsal
Tripti Nadakar

Soundtrack

References

External links
 
 

Nepalese romantic drama films
2010s Nepali-language films